Che Chew Chan (born 1 October 1982 in Pontian, Johor) is a Malaysian taekwondo practitioner. She is a three-time defending champion for the middleweight category and won a total of four gold medals at the Southeast Asian Games, a silver medalist at the 2007 Summer Universiade in Bangkok, Thailand, and a silver medalist at the 2008 Asian Taekwondo Championships in Luoyang, China.

Che qualified for the 2008 Summer Olympics in Beijing, after winning a gold medal for the women's 72 kg class at the Asian Taekwondo Qualifying Tournament for Beijing Olympic Games in Vietnam. She competed for the women's heavyweight category (+67 kg), where she first defeated Uzbekistan's Evgeniya Karimova in the preliminary match, with a decisive score of 5–4. A few hours later, she lost the quarterfinal match to Norway's Nina Solheim, with a score of 1–3. Because Solheim advanced further into the final match against Mexico's María del Rosario Espinoza, Che was offered another shot for a bronze medal triumph through the repechage bout, where she was eventually defeated by Egypt's Noha Abd Rabo, with a lethargic performance, at a score of 1–5.

References

External links

NBC Olympics Profile

1982 births
Living people
People from Johor
Malaysian people of Chinese descent
Malaysian female taekwondo practitioners
Olympic taekwondo practitioners of Malaysia
Taekwondo practitioners at the 2008 Summer Olympics
Universiade medalists in taekwondo
Southeast Asian Games gold medalists for Malaysia
Southeast Asian Games medalists in taekwondo
Competitors at the 2001 Southeast Asian Games
Competitors at the 2005 Southeast Asian Games
Competitors at the 2007 Southeast Asian Games
Competitors at the 2009 Southeast Asian Games
Universiade silver medalists for Malaysia
Asian Taekwondo Championships medalists
Medalists at the 2007 Summer Universiade
21st-century Malaysian women